Historically Vietnamese has two sets of numbers: one is etymologically native Vietnamese; the other uses Sino-Vietnamese vocabulary. In the modern language the native Vietnamese vocabulary is used for both everyday counting and mathematical purposes. The Sino-Vietnamese vocabulary is used only in fixed expressions or in Sino-Vietnamese words, in a similar way  that Latin and Greek numerals are used in modern English (e.g., the bi- prefix in bicycle). 

For numbers up to one million, native Vietnamese terms is often used the most, whilst mixed Sino-Vietnamese origin words and native Vietnamese words are used for units of one million or above.

Concept
For non-official purposes prior to the 20th century, Vietnamese had a writing system known as Hán-Nôm. Sino-Vietnamese numbers were written in Chữ Hán and native vocabulary was written in Chữ Nôm. Hence, there are two concurrent system in Vietnamese nowadays in the romanized script, one for native Vietnamese and one for Sino-Vietnamese.

In the modern Vietnamese writing system, numbers are written as Arabic numerals or in the romanized script Chữ Quốc ngữ (một, hai, ba), which had a Chữ Nôm character. Less common for numbers under one million are the numbers of Sino-Vietnamese origin (nhất [1], nhị [2], tam [3]), using Chữ Hán (classical Chinese characters). Chữ Hán and Chữ Nôm has all but become obsolete in the Vietnamese language, with the Latin-style of reading, writing, and pronouncing native Vietnamese and Sino-Vietnamese being wide spread instead, when France occupied Vietnam. Chữ Hán can still be seen in traditional temples or traditional literature or in cultural artefacts. The Hán-Nôm Institute resides in Hanoi, Vietnam.

Basic figures 

The following table is an overview of the basic Vietnamese numeric figures, provided in both native and Sino-Vietnamese counting systems. The form that is highlighted in green is the most widely used in all purposes whilst the ones highlighted in blue are seen as archaic but may still be in use. There are slight differences between the Hanoi and Saigon dialects of Vietnamese, readings between each are differentiated below.

Some other features of Vietnamese numerals include the following:
Outside of fixed Sino-Vietnamese expressions, Sino-Vietnamese words are usually used in combination with native Vietnamese words. For instance, "" combines native "" and Sino-Vietnamese "".
Modern Vietnamese separates place values in thousands instead of myriads. For example, "123123123" is recorded in Vietnamese as ", or '123 million, 123 thousand and 123'. Meanwhile, in Chinese, Japanese & Korean, the same number is rendered as "1億2312萬3123" (1 hundred-million, 2312 ten-thousand and 3123). 
Sino-Vietnamese numbers are not in frequent use in modern Vietnamese. Sino-Vietnamese numbers such as "" 'ten thousand', "" 'hundred-thousand' and "" 'million' are used for figures exceeding one thousand, but with the exception of  "" are becoming less commonly used. Number values for these words are used for each numeral increasing tenfold in digit value, 億 being the number for 105, 兆 for 106, et cetera. However, Triệu in Vietnamese and 兆 in Modern Chinese now have different values.

Other figures

When the number 1 appears after 20 in the unit digit, the pronunciation changes to "".
When the number 4 appears after 20 in the unit digit, it is more common to use Sino-Vietnamese "".
When the number 5 appears after 10 in the unit digit, the pronunciation changes to "".
When "" appears after 20, the pronunciation changes to "".

Ordinal numbers

Vietnamese ordinal numbers are generally preceded by the prefix "", which is a Sino-Vietnamese word which corresponds to "". For the ordinal numbers of one and four, the Sino-Vietnamese readings "" and "" are more commonly used; two is occasionally rendered using the Sino-Vietnamese "". In all other cases, the native Vietnamese number is used.

In formal cases, the ordinal number with the structure "đệ (第) + Sino-Vietnamese numbers" is used, especially in calling the generation of monarches, with an example being Nữ vương Elizabeth đệ nhị (Queen Elizabeth II).

Footnotes

See also
Japanese numerals, Korean numerals, Chinese numerals

Numerals
Vietnamese language